Jonathan Gibson may refer to:
Jonathan C. Gibson, Sr. (1793–1849), Virginia farmer, lawyer, politician and War of 1812 veteran
Jonathan C. Gibson (born 1833), American politician and soldier from Virginia
Jonathan Gibson, mayor of Pocahontas, Virginia
Jonathan Gibson (burgess) on List of members of the Virginia House of Burgesses
Jonathan Gibson (basketball) (born 1987), American basketball player
Jonathan Gibson (athlete), participated in 2007 South American Championships in Athletics

See also
Jon Gibson (disambiguation)